This article provides details of international football games played by the Japan national under-23 football team from 2020 to present.

Results

2021 

Games of the XXXII Olympiad – JFA.jp
2021 Schedules – JFA.jp (as of 16 December 2020)

2022

U-21

Forthcoming fixtures 
The following matches are scheduled:

2022

U-21 

 Fixtures – JFA.jp 
 2022 Schedule – JFA.jp (as of 17 December 2021)
 Fixtures and Results – Soccerway.com

2023

U-22

Notes

References

2020s in Japanese sport